Susana Brunetti (1941-1974), was an Argentine vedette, actress and singer, known for the films La fin del mundo (1963), ¿De quiénes son las mujeres? (1972), Este loco, loco, Buenos Aires (1973) and television shows like J.C. Buenos Aires-Roma-Paris (1964), El pastito (1972) and the popular sitcom Gorosito y señora (1973). She died of cancer on June 20, 1974 in Buenos Aires.

Films
Hombre de la esquina rosada
The Terrace
Villa Cariño
El Caradura y la millonaria

Television 

 Gorosito y señora (1973)

External links

References

1941 births
1974 deaths
Burials at La Recoleta Cemetery
Deaths from cancer in Argentina